Smaali Bouaabid is a Tunisian Paralympic athlete of short stature. He represented Tunisia at the 2016 Summer Paralympics in Rio de Janeiro, Brazil and he won the bronze medal in the men's shot put F40 event.

Achievements

References

External links 
 

Living people
Year of birth missing (living people)
Place of birth missing (living people)
Athletes (track and field) at the 2016 Summer Paralympics
Medalists at the 2016 Summer Paralympics
Paralympic bronze medalists for Tunisia
Paralympic medalists in athletics (track and field)
Paralympic athletes of Tunisia
Tunisian male shot putters
21st-century Tunisian people